Hickstead (March 2, 1996 – November 6, 2011) was a stallion ridden by Canadian Eric Lamaze. With rider Lamaze, he was an Olympic gold and silver medalist in show jumping. Hickstead was owned by Torrey Pines and Ashland Stables Inc.

He was born in Belgium. During his career, he won more than $4 million CDN.

Career
In 2006, Hickstead was a member of the winning Nations Cup Team in Florida. He also placed third in the Aachen Grand Prix and won the Duke Energy Cup at Spruce Meadows.

In 2007 Hickstead and Eric Lamaze won the coveted $1Million CN International at the Spruce Meadows "Masters" Tournament in Calgary, Alberta (Canada). During that event, he also won a record four ATCO Power Queen Elizabeth II Cup titles.

At the 2007 Pan Am Games, Hickstead and Eric Lamaze won team silver and individual bronze medals.

In 2008, Hickstead and Eric Lamaze won Individual Gold and Team Silver for Canada at the Beijing Olympic Games. This was the first individual gold medal won in equestrian, and second overall gold won by Canada in Olympic history, the other being a team medal coming from the 1968 Olympics.

In 2010 Hickstead earned the title 'Best Horse in the World' at the Alltech FEI World Equestrian Games(WEG) in Lexington, Kentucky. After completing the extremely rare feat of logging four clear rounds with four different riders in the Rolex Top Four Final, Hickstead was named Best Horse of the discipline. Under the unique format of the Top Four Final, riders with the four highest scores throughout the competition exchange horses.

Hickstead and Lamaze were also the 2010 champions of the Rolex Grand Prix at the prestigious CHIO Aachen: World Equestrian Festival in Germany.  In a competition where the top three combinations completed both rounds and the jump-off without faults, Hickstead raced to victory – finishing the jump-off in a time that was twenty four one hundredths of a second faster than that of the second place 'Carlina', ridden by Pius Schwizer of Switzerland.

In 2011 Eric Lamaze and Hickstead won the $1 million CN International for a second time.  The pair was second in the 2011 FEI World Cup Jumping Final in Leipzig, Germany.

On November 6, 2011, at a competition in Verona, Italy, Hickstead collapsed shortly after finishing a round and died of an aortic rupture. At the time, he was paired with Lamaze, the number one rider in the world.  Eric Lamaze had praised this horse in 2006:

Reactions to Hickstead's death

"I was watching it on tv and I would have never guessed it would happen at that point... I now care for horses and I'm joining a national cup." -Lana Jaeger, Long beach Mississippi

See also
 List of historical horses

References

External links
 Eric Lamaze at Olympic.ca
 Hickstead at Torrey Pines Stable
 Trinity Chinner
 EMG

1996 animal births
2011 animal deaths
Show jumping horses
Individual male horses
Horses in the Olympics
Horses in the Pan American Games
Filmed deaths in sports
Filmed deaths of animals
Horses who died from racing injuries